Crime et châtiment may refer to:

 Crime and Punishment (1935 French film)
 Crime and Punishment (1956 film)